The 2015–16 season will be Mansfield Town's 119th season in their history and their third consecutive season in League Two. Along with League Two, the club will also compete in the FA Cup, League Cup and League Trophy. The season covers the period from 1 July 2015 to 30 June 2016.

Competitions

Pre-season friendlies
On 7 May 2015, Mansfield Town announced three away pre-season friendlies against Rainworth Miners Welfare, Worksop Town and Basford United. On 21 May 2015, Mansfield Town announced Leicester City will visit the One Call Stadium. On 3 June 2015, Mansfield Town announced they will take a XI squad to face Barnsley on 18 July 2015 for Bobby Hassell's testimonial match. On 10 June 2015, it was announced Milton Keynes Dons will visit during pre-season. Another friendly, against Tamworth, was confirmed on 12 June 2015.

League Two

League table

Results summary

Results by matchday

Matches
On 17 June 2015, the fixtures for the forthcoming season were announced.

FA Cup
On 26 October 2015, the first round draw was made.

League Cup
On 16 June 2015, the first round draw was made, Mansfield Town were drawn away against Sheffield Wednesday.

Football League Trophy
On 8 August 2015, live on Soccer AM the draw for the first round of the Football League Trophy was drawn by Toni Duggan and Alex Scott. Stags travelled to Notts County.

Team details

Appearances and goals

|-
|colspan="14"|Left During Season

|}

Goalscorers

Disciplinary record

Transfers

Transfers in

Transfers out

Loans in

Loans out

References

Mansfield Town F.C. seasons
Mansfield Town